Butchers Lake is a small salt lake of the Corangamite catchment, located north of Lake Beeac and south of Lake Cundare, in the south-western lakes district of Victoria, Australia.

References

External links
 

Lakes of Victoria (Australia)
Western District (Victoria)